Mohana is a town and community development block in the Gajapati district of Odisha state in India. The town comes under the administrative control of Mohana Police station.

The town had a population of 5,197 in 2011 census and 4,759 in the 2001 census.

Mohana (Odisha Vidhan Sabha constituency) (Sl. No.: 136) is its Vidhan Sabha constituency. This constituency includes Mohana block, Udayagiri block, Nuagada block and Rayagada block.

References
 

 

Cities and towns in Gajapati district